Abu Dujana was a companion of the Islamic prophet Muhammad. 

It may also refer to:

Abu Dujana (Jemaah Islamiah) (born 1968), Indonesian military leader of Jemaah Islamiah
Abu Dujana (Jordanian) (1977–2009), alias of Humam Khalil Abu-Mulal al-Balawi, Jordanian doctor
Abu Dujana (Lashkar-e-Taiba) (died 2017), Lashkar-e-Taiba terrorist
Abu Dujana Al-Afghani, claimed spokesperson for "al-Qaeda of Europe"